Horn of Plenty (The Remixes) is a remix album by American indie rock band Grizzly Bear, released in 2005 on Kanine Records. The album features songs from the band's debut album, Horn of Plenty (2004).

Background
Regarding the decision to release a remix version of the band's debut album, Horn of Plenty (2004), drummer Christopher Bear stated, "The remixes for Horn of Plenty started because Kanine was going to re-release the album with better distribution but need some sort of "bonus" to make it happen. It was kind of Ed's pet project. He basically just emailed a lot of people and luckily most of them were down to do it. Everyone was very gracious for participating. [...] It is a fun way to think about music."

Track listing

References

Grizzly Bear (band) albums
2005 remix albums
Kanine Records albums